Alexandre Domingos Cristóvão M'Futila, best known as Alexander Christovao (born 14 March 1993) is an Angolan footballer who plays as a striker.

Club career
Born in Landana, he started playing in the Netherlands with lower-league side Be Quick 1887. Then he played with FC Groningen and SC Cambuur in the Eredivisie between 2012 and 2014.

By then he already had debuted in the Angolan national team so he called the attention of the leading Angolan clubs. Angolan premier league side Recreativo do Libolo brought him for their 2015 campaign which ended-up successfully as Libolo became national champions. At the end of the season he left and signed with Porcelana playing with them in the 2016 Girabola.

On 8 August 2016, he signed a 3-year contract with Serbian club FK Javor Ivanjica. He debuted for Javor in official matches, on 21 September 2016, in a Serbian Cup game against Proleter which Javor won by 1–0. He entered the game as a substitute in 66 minute. In the SuperLiga he debuted on 15 October 2016, in an away game against Metalac. Scoring 2 goals in 21 appearances in both domestic competitions for the club, he left the club in summer 2017.

He then joined in summer 2017 Polish side Zagłębie Sosnowiec helping them achieve promotion to Polish top-flight, and playing following season with them in the 2018–19 Ekstraklasa. His fine performances during the first-half of the season, called the attention of other clubs during the winter transfers window, and thus he got brought by the Romanian historical powerhouse Dinamo Bucharest, playing with them the second-half of the 2018–19 Liga I season. Dinamo finished the season in a disappointing 9th place, and Alexander Christovão left and signed with Saudi Arabian side Al-Mujazzal.

On 17 January 2020, Christovão signed for Keşla FK until the end of the 2019–20 season.

International career
Alexandre Cristóvão has been a regular member of the Angolan national team since his debut in 2014.

International goals
Scores and results list Angola's goal tally first.

Honours
Recreativo Libolo
Girabola: 2015

References

External links
 
 Voetbal International profile 

1993 births
Living people
People from Cabinda Province
People with acquired Dutch citizenship
Angolan footballers
Angola international footballers
Association football forwards
Be Quick 1887 players
FC Groningen players
SC Cambuur players
C.R.D. Libolo players
FK Javor Ivanjica players
Zagłębie Sosnowiec players
FC Dinamo București players
Eredivisie players
Girabola players
Al-Mujazzal Club players
Serbian SuperLiga players
Ekstraklasa players
I liga players
Liga I players
Saudi First Division League players
Angolan expatriate footballers
Angolan expatriate sportspeople in the Netherlands
Expatriate footballers in the Netherlands
Angolan expatriate sportspeople in Serbia
Expatriate footballers in Serbia
Angolan expatriate sportspeople in Poland
Expatriate footballers in Poland
Angolan expatriate sportspeople in Romania
Expatriate footballers in Romania
Expatriate footballers in Saudi Arabia
Shamakhi FK players
Expatriate footballers in Azerbaijan